Vita e pensiero is a magazine that was established on 1 December 1914 in Milan. It was proposed to be a mediator between the Catholic faith and the world and is still published as a magazine of the Università Cattolica del Sacro Cuore.

History 
The Franciscan Agostino Gemelli, Ludovico Necchi, and Francesco Olgiati established the magazine in 1914 for Catholics in order to discuss the political, economic, and social issues of the time.

External links 
 

1914 establishments in Italy
Catholic magazines published in Italy
Italian-language magazines
Magazines established in 1914
Magazines published in Milan
Religious magazines
Università Cattolica del Sacro Cuore